Broighter railway station served Broighter in County Londonderry in Northern Ireland.

The Londonderry and Coleraine Railway opened the station on 29 December 1852.

It closed on 3 July 1950.

Routes

References

Disused railway stations in County Londonderry
Railway stations opened in 1852
Railway stations closed in 1950
1852 establishments in Ireland

Railway stations in Northern Ireland opened in 1852